Steven Aaron Jordan (born November 2, 1971) is an American DJ, record producer, and television personality. One of the most successful record producers of the mid-to-late 1990s, Jordan won a 1997 Grammy Award for his work on Puff Daddy's debut album No Way Out and produced for a number of artists including Mariah Carey, Tevin Campbell, The Notorious B.I.G., 112, Jodeci, Faith Evans, Jay-Z, and Eve.

Early life
Steven Aaron Jordan was born on November 2, 1971 in Utica, New York to Moses Jordan and Penny Daniels. He was raised in Buffalo, New York and Rochester, New York by his father after his mother abandoned the family.

Career
Jordan first rose to fame as a member of Bad Boy Records' "Hitmen" roster of in-house producers and writers during the 1990s. He worked often with label owner Sean "Puffy" Combs, producing on several Bad Boy projects, such as the self-titled debut album of R&B quartet 112. Jordan produced their lead single "Only You" featuring The Notorious B.I.G. Jordan produced several records on Notorious B.I.G.'s Life After Death album, such as "Mo Money Mo Problems", "Nasty Boy", "Notorious Thugs" (featuring Bone Thugs-N-Harmony), "Another", "You're Nobody (Til Somebody Kills You)", and "Last Day". Jordan went on to win a Grammy Award for production work on Combs' No Way Out album, most notably the Notorious B.I.G. tribute song, I'll Be Missing You. Outside of his association with Bad Boy, he has also produced for artists including Mariah Carey, with whom he was nominated for a Grammy Award for the contribution on her album Butterfly (1997). From the album, he produced songs like "Honey" (the album's lead single), "Breakdown" (featuring Bone Thugs-n-Harmony), "Babydoll", and for Carey's #1's (1998) "I Still Believe" and "Theme from Mahogany (Do You Know Where You're Going To)". In the summer of 1997, three of the aforementioned Stevie J-produced records (I'll Be Missing You, Mo Money Mo Problems, and Honey) topped the Billboard Hot 100 consecutively from the chart weeks of June 14 through September 27, 1997.  He has also produced for Beyoncé, Jay-Z, Brian McKnight, Ma$e, Lil' Kim, Deborah Cox, Simbi Khali, Tamia and Tevin Campbell. Jordan also co-wrote the 2001 hit single "Let Me Blow Ya Mind" for Eve.

Prior to joining Bad Boy Records, Stevie J often performed with Jodeci as one of their live musicians, playing the bass guitar. Stevie also appeared on their 1995 album The Show, The After Party, The Hotel. Jordan was a member of Swing Mob, a Rochester, New York-based record label and music compound founded by Jodeci member DeVante Swing.  After Swing Mob folded and Jordan signed with Bad Boy, he continued a working relationship with Swing's younger brother and fellow Jodeci member Dalvin DeGrate, producing and singing on DeGrate's solo debut album, Met.A.Mor.Phic (2000).

In 2012, Stevie J began appearing as a primary cast member of the VH1 reality TV series, Love & Hip Hop: Atlanta, which featured him involved in a love triangle involving his then-girlfriend, Mimi Faust, and new girlfriend, Puerto Rican rapper, Joseline Hernandez. It was alleged that Stevie and Joseline Hernandez were married, but later revealed that they were actually not legally married.

Since the show premiered in 2012, Jordan and Hernandez have become a popular couple in the hip-hop world, making cameo appearances in music videos such as former labelmate Faith Evans' "I Deserve It", featuring Missy Elliott and Sharaya J, and Trey Songz's Hail Mary, featuring Young Jeezy and Lil Wayne. In 2016, Jordan announced that he will be producing and starring in a movie "That Time of the Month" which is set to be released by the end of the year.

Personal life

Jordan has been previously romantically linked to Eve and Alex Martin. He has six children:

 with Rhonda Henderson, son Dorian Henderson-Jordan (born 1995)
 with Felicia Stover, daughter Sade Jordan (born 1995)
 with Carol Antoinette Bennett, son Steven Jordan Jr. (born 1997) and daughter Savannah Jordan (born 1998)
 with Mimi Faust, daughter Eva Giselle Jordan (born 2009) 
 with Joseline Hernandez, daughter Bonnie Bella Hernandez (born December 28, 2016)

Both Mimi and Joseline appear with Stevie on Love & Hip Hop: Atlanta. Jordan was always known as a bad boy with wild relationships, but his show Leave It to Stevie chronicles not only him as a father and family man, but his growth and maturity, while falling for his best friend [Faith].

On February 1, 2017, Jordan was sentenced to three years of probation and ordered to pay $1,304,835 in restitution for non-payment of child support obligations.

He married Faith Evans, whom he had known and been friends with for over 20 years, in 2018. He has a grandson, Zion, from his eldest son, Dorian. He filed for divorce from Evans in 2021.

Works

Filmography

Television

References

External links

Interview with Stevie J at Mixonline

1971 births
20th-century African-American male singers
African-American male singer-songwriters
American rhythm and blues musicians
Record producers from New York (state)
Grammy Award winners for rap music
Living people
Participants in American reality television series
Musicians from Buffalo, New York
Musicians from Rochester, New York
Singer-songwriters from New York (state)
21st-century African-American male singers